Rein Järvelill (born 1966 in Uusvada, Võru County) is an Estonian politician. He was a member of IX Riigikogu.

Rein Järvelill graduated from the Estonian University of Life Sciences in 1994 with a degree in forestry. From 1994 until 1997, he studied law at the University of Tartu.

Järvelill has been the mayor of Värska from 2012 until 2017. He was formerly the municipality governor of Meremäe Parish.

He has been a member of Estonian Social Democratic Party.

References

Living people
1966 births
Social Democratic Party (Estonia) politicians
Members of the Riigikogu, 1999–2003
Mayors of places in Estonia
Estonian University of Life Sciences alumni
University of Tartu alumni
People from Setomaa Parish